Pachypodium rosulatum, common name elephant's foot plant, belongs to the family Apocynaceae.

Description
The leaves, which fall in the dry season, form a rosette on the top of branches. They are deciduous, dark green, oblanceolate, ovate or elliptical and petiolated. Flowering period extends from February through May. The fruits are 6 to 20 inches long and contain elongated seeds with a length of 6 mm.

Distribution
This plant is native to Madagascar and it is widespread on the central plateau.

Habitat
These plants prefer sunny and stony areas. The succulent caudex and the underground tuberous enable the plant to tolerate long periods of drought.

Gallery

References

 Journal of Botany, British and Foreign. London 20:219.  1882
 
 Rapanarivo SHJV, Lavranos JJ, Leeuwenberg AJM  Pachypodium (Apocynaceae): taxonomy, habitats and cultivation CRC Press, 1999

External links
 Cactus

rosulatum
Endemic flora of Madagascar
Caudiciform plants
Taxa named by John Gilbert Baker